Stanislav or Stanislaus (Latinized form) is a given name of Slavic origin, meaning someone who achieves glory or fame. It is common in the Slavic countries of Central and South Eastern Europe. The name has spread to many non-Slavic languages as well, such as French (Stanislas), German, and others.

The feminine form is Stanislava.

Polish language 

In Polish, the name Stanisław has the following common diminutives: Stach, Stan, Stańko, Staś, Stasio, Stasiek, Staszek. By 15th century the following diminutives were recorded: Stachnię, Stachnik, Stachno, Stachosz, Stachura, Stacher, Stachyr, Stachyra, Stasz, Staszak, Staszeczko, Staszek, Staszel, Stasiu. Many of them turned into family names. 

Variants: Stasław, Tasław.

Its feminine form is Stanisława.

Stasiek, Stach may also be surnames. 

Other derived surnames:
Stachow, Stachowiak, (fem.: Stachowiakowa, Stachowiakówna) Stachowicz Stachowska Stachowski Stachurka Stachwiak
Stanisławski (fem. Stanisławska), Stanczak
Stasiak, Stasicki, Stasiewski, Stasiński, Stasiuk, Staśkiewicz, Stasik
Staszak (Staszakowa), Staszewski, Staszkiel, Staszkiewicz, Staszyński (Ukrainian: Stashynsky)

East Slavic languages 

In Belarusian, Russian, and Ukrainian, the diminutive forms of the name are Stas, Stas and  Stasik.

 Slovene

In Slovene, the name Stanislav is usually abbreviated either to Stanko, Stano or Staňo.

 Other Станіслаў / Stanisłaŭ (Belarusian), Stanislav (Croatian, Czech, Serbian, Slovak and Slovene), Станіслав (Ukrainian), Станислав (Bulgarian, Russian, Serbian, Macedonian), Stanislas (French), Stanislaus (German, Latin), Stanislovas (Lithuanian), Staņislavs (Latvian), Stanislao (Italian), Estanislau (Portuguese), Ainéislis (Irish/Gaelic), Estanislao (Spanish) and Szaniszló''' (Hungarian).

This given name is often Anglicized to "Stanley", although "Stanley" has non-Slavic origin as well in English-speaking countries.

 People with the name 

 Saints 
 Stanislaus of Szczepanów (1030–1079)
 Stanisław Kazimierczyk (1433–1489)
 Stanislaus Kostka (1550–1568)
 Stanislaus Papczyński (1631 – 1701)

 Servant of God 

 Stanislaus Hosius (1504 – 1579)

 Monarchs 
 Stanisław Leszczyński (1677–1766), King of Poland
 Stanisław of Masovia (1501–1524), Duke of Masovia
 Stanisław August Poniatowski (1732–1798), King of Poland
 Louis Stanislas Xavier (1755–1824), King of France as Louis XVIII
 Francesco Giuseppe Carlo Ambrogio Stanislao, Duke of Modena as Francis IV

 Art, film and television 
 Stanislav Aseyev (born 1989), Ukrainian writer and journalist
 Estanislao del Campo (1834–1880), Argentine poet
 Stanislas de Guaita (1861–1897), French poet, expert on esotericism and European mysticism
 Stanisław Szukalski (1893–1987), Polish-born painter and sculptor
 Stanislav Bartůšek (born 1961), Czech television journalist
 Stanislav Govorukhin (1936–2018), Russian film director
 Stanislav Holý (1943–1998), Czech graphic artist, caricaturist, and designer of animated films
 Stanislav Ianevski (born 1985), Bulgarian actor who played Viktor Krum in Harry Potter Stanislav Kolíbal (born 1925), Czech artist
 Stanisław Jerzy Lec (1909–1966), Polish poet and aphorist
 Stanisław Lem (1921–2006), Polish science fiction author and philosopher
 Stanislav Lyubshin (born 1933), Russian actor, film director and People's Artist of the RSFSR (1981)
 Stanislas Merhar (born 1971), French actor of Slovene descent
 Stanislao Nievo (1928–2006), Italian writer, journalist and director
 Stanislav Rapotec (1911–1997), painter and patriot
 Stanislav Sadalsky, Soviet and Russian actor
 Stanislav Sokolov (born 1947), Russian stop-motion animation director
 Stanislas Torrents (1839–1916), French painter
 Stanislaus "Stan" Valchek, character in The Wire Stanko Vraz (1810–1851), Slovenian-Croatian poet
 Stanisław Wyspiański (1869–1907), Polish playwright, painter and poet
 Stan Borys (born 1941), Polish singer-songwriter, actor, director and poet
Bern Nadette Stanis(born Bernadette Stanislas 1953), American actress
 Franchot Tone (born Stanislaus Pascal Franchot Tone), American actor

 Military and politics 
 Stanislas Marie Adelaide, comte de Clermont-Tonnerre (1757–1792), French aristocrat, military officer and politician
 Stanislas de Boufflers (1738–1815), French statesman and writer
 Stane Dolanc (1925–1999), Slovenian and Yugoslav Communist politician
 Stanislav Galić (born 1943), Bosnian Serb commander
 Stanislav Gross (1969–2015), former Prime Minister of the Czech Republic
 Stanisław Grzmot-Skotnicki (1894–1939), Polish military commander and a general of the Polish Army, one of the principal commanders of Battle of Tuchola Forest
 Stanislav Hazheev (born 1941), Minister of Defence in Transnistria
 Stanislav Hurenko, leader of the Ukrainian Soviet Socialist Republic
 Stanislav of Kiev, last Kiev ruler of the Rurik Dynasty
 Stanisław Koniecpolski (c.1592–1646), Polish nobleman, voivode of Sandomierz
 Stanislav Kosior (1889–1939), Polish-born Soviet politician
 Estanislao López (1786–1838), governor and caudillo of Santa Fe, Argentina
 Stanisław Maczek (1892–1994), Polish tank commander of World War II
 Stanislav Melnyk (1961–2015), Ukrainian politician
 Stanisław Narutowicz or Stanislovas Narutavičius (1862–1932), Polish-Lithuanian lawyer and politician
 Stanislav Petrov (1939–2017), Soviet Air Defense Forces lieutenant colonel
 Stanislav Poplavsky (1902–1973), general in the Soviet and Polish armies
 Stanislav Shushkevich (1934–2022), Belarusian statesman and scientist
 Stanisław Świtalski, Polish colonel general
 Stanisław Sosabowski (1892–1967), Polish general in World War II
 Stanislaw Tillich (born 1959), German CDU politician of Sorbian ethnicity
 Stanislav Zimprich (1916–1942), Czech pilot who flew with the RAF in the Battle of Britain
 Stanisław Żółkiewski (1547–1620), Polish szlachta (nobleman), magnate and military commander
 Stanisław Żółtek (born 1956), Polish politician and a former member of the European Parliament

 Music 
 Stanislav Binički (1874–1942), Serbian composer, conductor and pedagogue
 Stanislav Bunin (born 1966), Russian-born pianist
 Stanislas de Barbeyrac, French operatic tenor
 Stanislao Gastaldon (1861–1939), Italian composer of light music
 Stanislav Ioudenitch (born 1971), Uzbekistani-born pianist
 Stanislao Mattei (1750–1825), Italian composer, musicologist and teacher
 Stanisław Moniuszko (1819–1872), Belarus-born Polish composer, conductor and teacher
 Stanko Premrl (1880–1965), author of the music for the Slovenian National Anthem
 Niska (born Stanislas Dinga Pinto), French rapper

 Sports 
 Stanislav Angelov (born 1978), Bulgarian footballer
 Estanislau Basora (1926–2012), Spanish Catalan footballer
 Stanislav Cherchesov (born 1963), Russian football manager and former international goalkeeper
 Stanislav Chistov (born 1983), Russian ice hockey player
 Stanislav Genchev (born 1981), Bulgarian footballer
 Estanislao Goya (born 1988), Argentine professional golfer
 Stanislav Griga (born 1961), Slovak retired football player and manager
 Stanislav Henych (born 1949), Czech cross-country skier
 Stanislas Julien (1797–1873), French sinologist
 Stanislav Lopukhov (born 1972), Russian breaststroke swimmer
 Stanislav Loska (born 1968), Czech paralympic athlete
 Stanislav Manolev (born 1985), Bulgarian footballer
 Stanislav "Slava" Medvedenko (born 1979), Ukrainian basketball player
 Stan Mikita (born Stanislav Guoth, 1940–2018), Slovak/Canadian ice hockey player for the Chicago Blackhawks
 Stanislav Morozov (born 1979), Ukrainian pairs figure skater
 Stan Musial (born Stanisław Musiał, 1920–2013), American baseball player
 Stanislav Neckář (born 1975), Czech ice hockey player
 Stanislav Nedkov (born 1981), Bulgarian mixed martial arts fighter
 Stanislav Ossinskiy (born 1984), Kazakhstani backstroke swimmer
 Stanislav Pozdnyakov (born 1973), Russian fencer
 Stanislav Prins (born 1988), Estonian footballer
 Stanisław Rola (born 1957), Polish race walker
 Stanislav Rumenov (born 1980), Bulgarian footballer
 Stanislav Šesták (born 1982), Slovak football striker
 Stanislav Stoyanov (born 1976), Bulgarian football defender
 Estanislao Struway, (born 1968) Paraguayan football midfielder
 Stanislav Tarasenko (born 1966), Russian long jumper
 Stanislav Timchenko (born 1983), Russian figure skater
 Stanislav Varga (born 1972), Slovak footballer
 Stanislav Vlček (born 1976), Czech football striker
 Stanislas "Stan" Wawrinka (born 1985), Swiss professional tennis player
 Stanislav Zabrodsky (born 1962), Kazakh archer
 Stanislav Zakharov (born 1981), Russian pairs figure skater
 Stanislav Zhuk (died 1998), Soviet figure skater and coach

 Other 
 Estanislao (c. 1798–1838), Native American chieftain
 Stanislav (čelnik) (fl. 1377), Serbian noble
 Stanislav of Lesnovo (fl. 1330–42), Serbian monk-scribe
 Stanislav Andreski (born 1919), Polish-British sociologist
 Stanko Bloudek (1890–1959), Slovenian plane and automobile designer
 Stanislao Cannizzaro (1826–1910), Italian chemist remembered for the Cannizzaro reaction and the Karlsruhe Congress of 1860
 Stanisław Dziwisz (born 1939), a Polish prelate of the Roman Catholic Church
 Stanislav Grof (born 1931), one of the founders of the field of transpersonal psychology
 Stanislaus Grumman, character from His Dark Materials''
 Stanislaus Hosius (1504–1579), Polish Roman Catholic cardinal and Prince-Bishop of Warmia
 Stanislaus Joyce (1884–1955), brother of James Joyce
 Stanislaus Katczinsky, All Quiet on the Western Front character
 Stanislav Kriventsov (born 1973), international chess master
 Stanislaw "Stanley" Kuklinski (1906–1977), father of Richard Kuklinski
 Stanisław Mazur (1905–1981), Polish mathematician
 Stanislaus von Prowazek (1875–1912), Czech zoologist and parasitologist
 Stanisław Albrecht Radziwiłł, Polish-British nobleman and philanthropist
 Stanislav Segert (1921–2005), scholar of Semitic languages
 Stanislav Shatsky (1878–1934), late Tsarist and early Soviet humanistic educator, writer, and educational administrator
 Stanislav Shwarts (1919–1976), Soviet ecologist and zoologist
 Stanislav Strumilin (1877–1974), Soviet economist who developed the Strumilin index
 Stanisław Trepczyński (1924–1993), Polish diplomat
 Stanislaw Ulam (1909–1984), Polish born American mathematician
 Stanislav Vydra (1741–1804), Bohemian writer, mathematician and Jesuit

See also 
 Stanko
 Stanislav (disambiguation)
 Saint Stanislaus (disambiguation)

References

Masculine given names
Slavic masculine given names
Russian masculine given names
Bulgarian masculine given names
Polish masculine given names
Serbian masculine given names
Belarusian masculine given names